Mindenki is the seventh Hungarian language studio album by Hungarian rock band Locomotiv GT released in late autumn 1978. The band recorded the album without guest musicians. This was the first Locomotiv GT album without guests since the Mindig magasabbra album in 1975. The album was also released in Czechoslovakia.

Track listing

Side One
"Mindenféle emberek" (Gábor Presser, Dusán Sztevánovity) - 5:11
"Nézd, az őrült" (Presser, Sztevánovity) - 5:45
"Baba - Rock" (Tamás Somló) - 5:01
"Mi lesz velem?" (Presser) - 3:42

Side Two
"Hirdetés" (Presser, Sztevánovity) - 6:22
"A Téma" (János Karácsony, Sztevánovity) - 4:37
"Az utolsó szerelmes dal" (Karácsony, Ferenc Demjén) - 3:40
"Nem adom fel" (Presser, Stevánovity) - 4:17

Personnel
Gábor Presser - Yamaha electric grand piano, Yamaha grand piano, ARP Axxe, clavinet, percussion, vocals
Tamás Somló - bass guitar, saxophone, percussion, vocals
János Karácsony - guitars, percussion, Moog synthesizer, vocals
János Solti - drums, percussion

Production 
Péter Péterdi - Music director
György Kovács - Sound engineer
András Alapfy - Graphics

External links
Information at the official LGT website
Lyrics at the official LGT website
Information at the Hungaroton website
Contemporary album review in the Budapest Daily News.

1978 albums